Storm in a Teacup is a 1937 British romantic comedy film directed by Ian Dalrymple and Victor Saville and starring Vivien Leigh, Rex Harrison (in his first starring role), Cecil Parker, and Sara Allgood. It is based on the German play  by Bruno Frank, as well as the English-language adaptations: London's Storm in a Teacup and Broadway's Storm Over Patsy, both written by James Bridie. A reporter writes an article that embarrasses a politician. Meanwhile, the newspaperman is also attracted to his target's daughter.

Plot
A Scottish town's powerful provost (mayor) struts and brags about his city "improvements" while the cowed villagers are sullenly forced to put up with him. A free-spirited English reporter (Rex Harrison) is brought from London to work for the local newspaper and soon clashes with the autocrat—while falling in love with his daughter (Vivien Leigh). He strikes out against the Provost by taking up the cause of a poor woman who sells ice cream from a pushcart, and has dared to protest against the provost's new "dog tax". The local police are about to put her sheepdog Patsy to death because she cannot pay the back taxes and subsequent fine incurred by her ownership of the dog.

The idealistic young reporter exposes the injustice in the local newspaper before the editors have a chance to suppress the article, and it sparksan indignant protest campaign all over England and Scotland. The furious provost rashly sues the "cheeky little rotter from London" for libel. A courtroom scene ensues which strongly resembles a "kangaroo trial" until, in view of local support for the defendant (with the villagers humorously barking like dogs) and the budding love affair between the reporter and the provost daughter, the provost gives up, and all is happily resolved.

Cast

Reception
At the time of the film's initial release, reviews were favourable. In The New York Times, Frank S. Nugent called it "an engaging miniature" and "a splendid comic brew". The critic for The Montreal Gazette wrote, "the excellent story is done fullest justice by the directors, Victor Saville and Dalrymple, and by the large and often-brilliant cast." The critic for Boys' Life called it "a riot of fun for the audience."

The number of favourable reviews grew over time. Leonard Maltin rated this movie three out of four stars and called it "witty social comedy." The book Guide to British Cinema considered this film as one of Victor Saville's "well-crafted, genre films" and "the breezy Rex Harrison–Vivien Leigh social comedy." The book British Film Directors: A Critical Guide called it "a whimsical comedy with anti-fascist undercurrents." The book A Chorus of Raspberries: British Film Comedy 1929–1939 considered this film "one of the best British comedies of the decade."

Anne Edwards, author of the 1977 biography of Vivien Leigh, considered this film a "funny but inconsequential comedy;" nevertheless, she called Leigh's performance "witty and warm" for her role that "could not have given [Leigh] much pride of accomplishment."

References

Bibliography
 Edwards, Anne. Vivien Leigh: A Biography. New York City: Simon and Schuster, 1977. Print. .

Further reading
 McFarlane, Brian, ed.; Anthony Slide, asst. ed. The Encyclopedia of British Film: Second Edition – Fully Updated and Revised. London: Methuen Publishing, 2005. Print. .
 Moore, Rachel. "Love Machines." Film Studies 4 (2004): 2–3. Web. 4 Jan 2012.
 
 Slide, Anthony. Fifty Classic British Films, 1932–1982: A Pictorial Record. New York City: Dover Publications, Inc., 1985. Print. .
 Library of Congress, Copyright Office. Catalog of Copyright Entries: Part 1, Group 3: Dramatic Composition and Motion Pictures: 1938 New Series: Volume 11, No. 2. p. 1375 Washington: GPO, 1939.
 Library of Congress, Copyright Office. Catalog of Copyright Entries Part 1, Group 3, 1937 New Series, Volume 10, No. 10. page 591. Washington: GPO, 1938. p. 591
Library of Congress. Copyright Office. Federal Register, April 17, 1998 (Volume 63, Number 74): "Notices" pp. 19299-19300" Washington: GPO, 1998.

External links 
 
 
 
 

1937 films
1937 romantic comedy films
British romantic comedy films
1930s screwball comedy films
British black-and-white films
London Films films
British films based on plays
Films set in Scotland
Films directed by Ian Dalrymple
Films directed by Victor Saville
Films with screenplays by Ian Dalrymple
British remakes of German films
Remakes of Austrian films
Films produced by Victor Saville
1930s English-language films
1930s British films